Huellas (English: Traces) is the 17th studio album by Mexican pop singer Yuri. It was released in 1998. It sold more than 200,000 copies earning 2 Gold discs.

Reception
Yuri comes back to the public view with this album of inspirational style under the supervision of Polygram. This is a foray into Gospel music, pop, hip hop and blues. Four singles were extracted:"¿Y tú como estás?" (How are you?), "Soy Feliz" (I'm happy), "Ven y tócame" (Come and touch me) and  "Hoy que estamos juntos" (Today we are together). She achieves to chart in the first spots of the Religious radio stations with her songs: "Jesucristo" (Jesus Christ), "María Magdalena" (Mary Magdalene), "El milagro" (The miracle) and "Deja al amor fluir" (Let love flow).
She creates polemic and controversy in the Mexican news because of her radical prudery, leaving behind the femme fatale image, since that representation didn't match with her then-style of religious. With this album, she announced an indefinite cease to her career in order to dedicate her time to divulge God's word and welfare.

It reached No. 12 in Pop Latin Albums in Billboard.

Track listing 

[]

Production
 Producer: Alejandro Zepeda
 Musical arrangements: Alex Zepeda and Arturo Pérez
 Musicians: Arturo Pérez, Michael Landau, Neil Stubenhouse, Alex Zepeda, Phenix Horns
 Backing vocals: Kanny O'Brian, Carlos Murguía, Leyla Hoyle, María del Rey
 Recorded in: Z. LAB, Mexico, Westlake (A) Audio, Castle Oaks, Westlake (D)
 Mix engineer: Antonio Canasio
 Mastering: Bernie Grundman
 Art direction: Arturo Medellín, Manuel Calderón
 Photography: Adolfo Pérez Butron
 Graphic design: Ulises Quezada

Singles

Non-Christian Charts
 ¿Y Tú Cómo Estás?
 Soy feliz
 Hoy que estamos juntos (Duet with Rodrigo, her husband)
 Ven y tócame

Christian Radio Stations
 María Magdalena
 Jesucristo
 El Milagro
 Deja al amor fluir

Single charts

Album chart

References 

1998 albums
Yuri (Mexican singer) albums